Paul Calderón  is a Puerto Rican actor, writer, director and producer. He is a founding member of the Touchstone Theatre, the American Folk Theatre and the LAByrinth Theater Company. He is also a member of the Actors Studio, auditioning and accepted as a member in 1984 alongside Melissa Leo and two other actors.

Early life
Calderón was born in Puerto Rico, and moved to New York City as a child. After a stint in the United States Army, studied acting under the G.I. Bill. He became a member of the Actors Studio in 1984, and was a founding member of the LAByrinth Theater Company.

Career
Calderón  got his big break in 1984 in a revival of Miguel Piñero's Short Eyes directed by Kevin Conway at the Second Stage Theatre. In 1995 he won an Obie and an Audelco Award for his performance in Blade to the Heat at the Public Theater. His most notable Broadway role was opposite Robert De Niro in Cuba and His Teddy Bear.

He appeared Off-Broadway in such plays as Requiem for a Heavyweight; Two Sisters and a Piano and Dancing on Her Knees, both written by Nilo Cruz; Troilus and Cressida at the Delacorte Theater in Central Park, in the role of Achilles; and Divine Horsemen for the LAByrinth Theater Company, a play which he had written, directed and produced.

In the 1980s, Calderón appeared in several TV series. He acted in three episodes of Miami Vice, playing a different character in each. He also appeared in the extended music video of "Bad" by Michael Jackson (who played the film's main character, Darryl).

Calderón co-wrote Abel Ferrara's 1992 crime drama Bad Lieutenant, starring Harvey Keitel; Calderón also performed in the film. He has had various short stories published in literary journals. His last published story was "Primitive Grace" for the international e-magazine Noir Nation.

Calderón was almost cast as Jules Winnfield in the 1994 film Pulp Fiction, since director Quentin Tarantino was so impressed by his audition. The role eventually went to Samuel L. Jackson, but Calderón was given a role as a bartender, Paul, who quips the famous line, "Hey, my name's Paul and this shit's between y'all," to John Travolta's character, Vincent Vega.

He has performed in numerous feature films, including King of New York, Sea of Love, The Last Castle, The Firm, Four Rooms, Out of Sight, La Soga, Cop Land, Addiction, and 21 Grams.

He has made many guest appearances on television series, including recurring roles on Dream Street, Law & Order and Miami Vice. In 2012, he guest-starred in the Blue Bloods episode "Domestic Disturbance", playing Lieutenant Martin Perez. (He reprised the role in the 2016 Blue Bloods episode "Back in the Day".) Calderón worked on two films in 2012: West End, directed by Joe Basille; and Biodegradable, a futuristic film shot in the Dominican Republic with an all Latino cast, directed by Juan Basanta. In 2014, he played Arquimedes, the bodyguard of Enoch "Nucky" Thompson in seven episodes of the fifth (final) season of the HBO series Boardwalk Empire. He played Alejandro, a recurring role on Fear the Walking Dead. Since 2017, he has appeared as Detective Santiago "Jimmy" Robertson on the Amazon TV series, Bosch.

Personal life
Calderón lives in Brooklyn with his wife Catherine. They have two children.

Filmography 
 Tenement (1985) - Hector
 Rockabye (1986 television film) - Street Vendor
 Band of the Hand (1986) - Tito
 Sticky Fingers (1988) - Speed
 Sea of Love (1989) - Juan
 The Chair (1989) - Pizza
 King of New York (1990) - Joey Dalesio
 Q&A (1990)
 CrissCross (1992) - Blacky
 Bad Lieutenant (1992) - Cop #1
 The Firm (1993) - Thomas Richie
 Pulp Fiction (1994) - Paul
 Clockers (1995) - Jesus at Hambones
 The Addiction (1995) - Professor
 Four Rooms (1995) - Norman (Segment: "The Man from Hollywood")
 Cop Land (1997) - Hector
 OK Garage (1998) - Carl
 One Tough Cop (1998) - Sgt. Diaz
 Oxygen (1999) - Jesse
 Girlfight (2000) - Sandro Guzman
 Once in the Life (2000) - Manny Rivera
 The Last Castle (2001) - Sergeant Major Dellwo
 Kill the Poor (2003) - Carlos
 21 Grams - Brown
 The Sentinel (2006) - Deputy Director Cortes
 La Soga (2009) - Rafa
 The Hungry Ghosts (2009) - Carl
 Lie to Me- “Unchained”-S1 E5 (2009) - Manny Trillo 
 Boardwalk Empire (2014) - Arquimedes
 Fear the Walking Dead (television series; 2016) - Alejandro (6 episodes)
 Bosch (television series; 2017—2021) - Detective Santiago Robertson
 Antrum (2018) - Dr. Ivan Gaston

See also

List of Puerto Ricans

References

External links
 
 

Living people
Obie Award recipients
People from East Harlem
People from the Lower East Side
Puerto Rican male film actors
Puerto Rican male stage actors
Puerto Rican male television actors
Year of birth missing (living people)